Damien Djordjevic (born 1 July 1984 in Aix-en-Provence) is a French former competitive figure skater. He is the 2002 French junior national champion and competed at the World Junior and European Championships. His highest placement at an ISU Championship was 5th at the 2002 Junior Worlds.

Career
He is a skater choreographer with French theater company Trafic de Styles.

Programs

Competitive highlights 
JGP: Junior Grand Prix

References

External links
 

French male single skaters
Figure skaters at the 2007 Winter Universiade
1984 births
Living people